Da’Mon Teshone Merkerson (born April 5, 1989) is an American football cornerback who is currently a free agent. He was signed by the Arizona Cardinals as an undrafted free agent in 2011. He played college football at Syracuse University.

Early years
Merkerson grew up in Passaic, New Jersey and attended St. Mary High School in Rutherford, New Jersey where he was a three-sport athlete. He played football, basketball and track. He was All county in football and track and field (400 Meter Dash). After switching back from wide receiver to cornerback in his senior season he found a home at cornerback. Tied for 8th in the Big East with passes defended. Merkerson helped lead the orange to victory against Kansas State in the Inaugural New Era Pinstripe Bowl.

Professional career

Arizona Cardinals
Merkerson signed with the Arizona Cardinals in July 2011, but he was released just 3 days later.

Arizona Rattlers
From 2012 to 2014, Merkerson had been a member of the Arizona Rattlers of the Arena Football League (AFL), helping the team win back-to-back ArenaBowl Championships.

References

External links
Syracuse bio
Arena Football League bio 

1989 births
Living people
American football cornerbacks
Syracuse Orange football players
Arizona Rattlers players
Sportspeople from Passaic, New Jersey
Players of American football from New Jersey
African-American players of American football
21st-century African-American sportspeople
20th-century African-American people